The Oaxaca sparrow (Aimophila notosticta) is a species of bird in the family Passerellidae that is endemic to the Mexican state of Oaxaca, where it lives in dry forests and thornscrub. The population is in slow decline due to habitat loss.

References

Oaxaca sparrow
Endemic birds of Western Mexico
Oaxaca sparrow
Oaxaca sparrow
Oaxaca sparrow
Taxonomy articles created by Polbot